"The One in Vegas" is a double length episode of Friends fifth season. It first aired on the NBC network in the United States on May 20, 1999, as the finale of season five.

Plot

Part I
Joey works at Caesars Palace as a costumed "atmosphere" character, as the film that was going to be his "big break" has been placed on indefinite hiatus. Chandler, following his fight with Joey about the film, has been trying to apologize by phone, but is repeatedly rebuffed by Joey, particularly since he does not want to admit Chandler turned out to be right. When Joey calls Phoebe on the apartment phone, Chandler decides to fly out and visit Joey in person, which Joey overhears, so he allows Chandler to talk to him, forgiving him for the incident but telling him not to come to Vegas.

Monica reveals to Phoebe that she had lunch with her old flame Richard; she has not been able to tell Chandler because their first anniversary is coming up and she does not want him to get jealous. When Chandler arrives, Monica reveals her gift to Chandler: two tickets to Vegas for their anniversary. Phoebe buys in to make up for missing Ross's wedding in London due to her pregnancy. Finally, she invites Ross and Rachel as well, but they decide to fly out a day later due to work commitments.

On the plane, as Phoebe goes to the restroom, Chandler realizes he forgot his anniversary present to her, but Monica immediately forgives him. Chandler says it is the worst thing that can happen on their anniversary the minute Phoebe returns, making Phoebe assume that Monica told him about Richard, which causes tension between the couple. When Monica, Chandler and Phoebe arrive at Caesars Palace, they find Joey, who admits that he is working there while his movie is on hiatus, and apologizes to Chandler for not telling him. Chandler and Monica then quickly get into a huge fight over whether she would see Richard again, and split off. Phoebe counsels Monica to tell Chandler that she loves him and not Richard. Monica sets out to do so, but gets sucked into a craps game by accident and then starts winning. Meanwhile, Phoebe tells Chandler to look for Monica to receive her apology, only for him to walk away silently when he finds her hugging a bystander in joyous celebration at the craps table.

Rachel takes advantage of the empty apartment to act on Phoebe's suggestion and wander around the apartment completely in the nude. However, Ross sees her from across the street and assumes she is coming on to him. This leads to an awkward conversation in the hall, and then escalating attempts to embarrass each other on the plane the next day. After inconclusive attempts to out-embarrass each other, Rachel falls asleep on Ross's shoulder, and Ross draws a beard and mustache on her face with a pen.

Part II

Rachel is oblivious to the beard and mustache Ross drew on her face until they meet Phoebe and Joey in the Caesar's Palace lobby; she storms off to the restrooms, where she discovers that the marker Ross borrowed is permanent. She refuses to leave the hotel room but still demands the Vegas experience, leading her to eviscerate Ross's mini-bar and leading him to "lose" to her repeatedly at blackjack. Eventually they both get drunk, and parade happily around the casino in alcoholic equality: Ross with cat whiskers doodled on his face by Rachel.

Phoebe has to deal with an elderly female "lurker"—someone who takes slot machines Phoebe has just abandoned and manages to land jackpots with them. She attempts to antagonize the woman into leaving her alone. Meanwhile, Joey discovers his "hand twin"—a man whose hands are identical to Joey's; this man immediately gets drafted into Joey's get-rich-quick scheming. Both Phoebe and Joey are eventually thrown out of the casino.

While Monica plays another game at the craps table, Chandler is towing his luggage behind, preparing to go home alone. Monica quickly apologizes to him, saying she will never see Richard again. After she proclaims that Chandler is the love of her life, he forgives her and joins her at the craps table, calling the numbers she should bet on. He makes increasingly extravagant promises to the crowd, culminating in him betting to Monica that they get married immediately if she rolls a hard eight. Monica rolls a four with one die, but the other goes wild and lands beneath the table on-edge, showing a four on one side and a five on the other. Chandler decides it is a four, and Monica agrees. They arrive at Las Vegas wedding chapel to get married but have to wait as the chapel is currently in use. Finally, its occupants burst out in joyous celebration: Ross and Rachel, still drunk and doodled-on, and now legally married. They charge out into the night while Chandler and Monica stare in shock.

Reception
In the original broadcast, the episode was viewed by 25.9 million viewers.

Sam Ashurst from Digital Spy ranked the first part #220 and the second part #232 on their ranking of the 236 Friends episodes.

Telegraph & Argus ranked the first part #143 and the second part #223 on their ranking of the 236 Friends episodes.

GamesRadar+ ranked "The One in Vegas" the twentieth best Friends episode.

References

1999 American television episodes
Friends (season 5) episodes
Television shows set in the Las Vegas Valley